Jeremy de León (born 18 March 2004) is a Puerto Rican footballer who plays for Castellón of the Spanish Primera Federación.

Club career
As a youth de León played for local side Hispania FA. At age 9 he was invited to trial with Sevilla. At the age of ten in April 2014, he was invited to Spain to participate in a trial and youth tournament for Málaga and a second training period with Sevilla. While playing for GPS Puerto Rico in the Sheffield Cup in 2019, he was spotted by the International Development Academy based in Valencia and he and his family moved to Spain to join the club in summer 2020.

In winter 2021/22 he joined the youth team of CD Castellón. After being the team's top scorer with thirteen goals in thirteen matches in the U19 league, the player attracted interest from La Liga clubs Barcelona, Almería, and Sevilla in spring 2022. Shortly thereafter he was linked with moves to Real Madrid, Atlético Madrid, and Real Betis. Despite the interest, de León signed his first professional contract with Castellón in May 2022, a two-year deal which would see him remain at the club until 2024. He made his debut for the club the same month against Villarreal B. The following month Valencia was exploring loan options for the player.

International career
At the youth level de León represented Puerto Rico in 2022 CONCACAF U-20 Championship qualifying. He scored two goals against Bermuda in the final Group Stage match, an eventual victory which saw Puerto Rico qualify for the final tournament. The same year he was named to Puerto Rico's squad for the 2022 UNCAF U-19 Tournament in Belize. He went on to score two goals in a 3–3 draw with Panama.

De León received his first call-up to the senior national team in summer 2022 for 2022–23 CONCACAF Nations League C matches.

References

External links

2004 births
Living people
Sportspeople from San Juan, Puerto Rico
Puerto Rican footballers
Association football forwards
Primera Federación players
CD Castellón footballers
Puerto Rico international footballers
Expatriate footballers in Spain
Puerto Rican expatriate footballers